Dioryctria stenopterella is a species of snout moth in the genus Dioryctria. It was described by Hans Georg Amsel in 1960 and is known from Iran.

References

Moths described in 1960
stenopterella